Ludwig van Beethoven's Piano Sonata No. 6 in F major, Op. 10, No. 2, was dedicated to the Countess Anne Margarete von Browne, and written from 1796 to 1798.

The sonata spans approximately 13 minutes.

Form

The sonata is divided into three movements:

First movement 

The first movement is in sonata form. The development is based on the C–G–C tag which concludes the exposition, with no clear use of any other material from the exposition. The recapitulation is unusual because the 1st theme returns in D major before modulating back to tonic for the second theme.

Second movement 

The second movement is a minuet in F minor with a trio, with the return of the minuet strongly embellished. It is more reminiscent of Beethoven's bagatelles than of most of his minuets. The trio, in D major, has a hint of anticipation of the third movement of Symphony No. 1.

Third movement 

The third movement is in sonata form, with a fugal development.  The exposition has theme 1 in F major and a closing section in C major.  The recapitulation is unusual because the 1st theme is a fugal variation instead of a literal repeat.  The movement has a coda based on the closing section.

External links
A lecture by András Schiff on Beethoven's piano sonata Op. 10, No. 2
For a public domain recording of this sonata visit Musopen

Piano Sonata 06
1798 compositions
Compositions in F major
Music with dedications